93 Herculis is a star located around 750 light years away from the Sun in the northern constellation of Hercules. It is visible to the naked eye as a faint, orange-hued star with an apparent visual magnitude of 4.67 The brightness of the star is diminished by an extinction of 0.21 due to interstellar dust. It is moving closer to the Earth with a heliocentric radial velocity of −24.5 km/s. This star, together with 95 Her, 102 Her, and 109 Her, made up the obsolete constellation Cerberus.

This object has a stellar classification of K0.5IIb, which indicates it is an evolved bright giant. With the supply of hydrogen at its core exhausted, the star has expanded to 51 times the Sun's radius. It is radiating around 919 times the luminosity of the Sun from its enlarged photosphere at an effective temperature of 4,471 K. It is generally deficient in metal elements, but appears weakly enhanced in barium and other heavier elements. This is a suspected barium star and hence may have a white dwarf companion in orbit.

References

K-type bright giants
Barium stars
Hercules (constellation)
Durchmusterung objects
Herculis, 093
164349
088128
6713